South Hampshire is a term used mainly to refer to the conurbation formed by the city of Portsmouth, city of Southampton and the non-metropolitan boroughs of Gosport, Fareham, Havant and Eastleigh in southern Hampshire, South East England. The area was estimated to have a population of over 1.5 million in 2013. It is the most populated part of South East England, excluding London. The area is sometimes referred to as Solent City particularly in relation to local devolution, but the term is controversial.

History
Harold Wilson's Labour government commissioned town planner Colin Buchanan in 1965 to study the region. He found a region of growing economic importance, in desperate need of proper planning to avoid unplanned sprawl, and suggested the construction of a modernist urban area between Southampton and Portsmouth. However this was resisted by local authorities who occupied the proposed development sites, and Buchanan's plans were never put into effect.

Instead, as a result of high-tech industry and services, the area grew largely without overall planning to become perhaps the most densely populated region of the UK. In the late 20th century mass manufacturing of ordinary commodities declined leaving several town and city neighbourhoods impoverished and suffering unemployment, however by the early 21st century high income and retirement properties came to dominate some neighbourhoods, particularly close to universities, and many suburbs and exurbs. Centrally planned building programmes included large estates, carefully connected by new road networks, of commercial and residential use by Hampshire County Council's architects, led by Colin Stansfield Smith. Otherwise development has tended to be a case-by-case basis for retail parks, business parks and housing.

The Solent Local Enterprise Partnership (LEP), a collaboration between local authorities, universities and businesses set up in 2011 by the Department for Business, Innovation and Skills. Different departments of the Solent LEP are distributed across the area, with its 'Growth Hub' being based in Southampton. On 12 November 2013 the government announced the second wave of City Deals, with a successful joint bid of Southampton and Portsmouth providing £953 million of investment into the Solent LEP. Various attempts at a South Hampshire or Solent City devolution deal, the latter sometimes including the Isle of Wight, have also been made, but have seen local resistance, stemming from the Southampton-Portsmouth rivalry, as well as from the more rural Isle of Wight. Whilst the proposal did see some continued support, particularly from councillors, by 2018 talks with the government had stalled.

Geography

The region can be subdivided into two conurbations, one centred around Southampton and one around Portsmouth. Most of the area is in the Hampshire districts of Gosport, Fareham, Havant, Eastleigh, Portsmouth and Southampton. All of these districts have high population densities, with Portsmouth and Southampton being the most densely populated districts in England outside Greater London. Other parts of the area are in the Test Valley, East Hampshire, City of Winchester and New Forest districts all of which have comparatively lower population densities. Small parts of the area are also in the West Sussex district of Chichester.

Climate

The climate is temperate oceanic, Cfb in the Köppen climate classification.

Demography
The following Built-up areas fall inside the South Hampshire metropolitan area have a combined population of 1,086,786.

By council boundaries

The following populations is those of council boundaries that are considered part of the South Hampshire conurbation.

South Hampshire Built-up Area
In the 2001 census Portsmouth and Southampton were recorded as being parts of separate urban areas however by the time of the 2011 census they had merged to become the sixth largest built-up area in England with a population of 855,569. The new built-up area also merged with smaller urban areas called Locks Heath, Bursledon, Whiteley and Hedge End/Botley in the 2001 census.

Notes:

Other built-up areas
There are three other significant urban areas in the area:

There are fourteen smaller urban areas also in the region:

Notes:

Other towns in the area
Slightly further out there are many satellite towns that may not be directly attached to Southampton or Portsmouth, or necessarily in their Travel to work areas, but are nonetheless still heavily reliant on the two cities for employment and services.

Places within the wider Portsmouth-Southampton Metropolitan area include:

See also

South Hampshire Plan
BBC Radio Solent
List of metropolitan areas in the United Kingdom
List of urban areas in the United Kingdom
M27 motorway

References

Geography of Hampshire
Metropolitan areas of England
Urban areas of England